Sir Hugh Crofton, 2nd Baronet (17 July 1763 – 6 January 1834) was an Anglo-Irish politician.

Crofton was the son of Sir Morgan Crofton, 1st Baronet and Jeanne d'Abzac. Between 1786 and 1790 he sat in the Irish House of Commons as the Member of Parliament for Tulsk. He married Frances Smyth, daughter of Ralph Smyth, in June 1787. On 12 February 1802, he succeeded to his father's baronetcy.

References

1763 births
1834 deaths
18th-century Anglo-Irish people
19th-century Anglo-Irish people
Irish MPs 1783–1790
Baronets in the Baronetage of the United Kingdom
Hugh